Karl (Karol) Duldig (29 December 1902 – 11 August 1986) was a Jewish modernist sculptor.  He was born in Przemyśl, Poland then part of the Austro-Hungarian Empire due to annexation, and later moved to Vienna. Following the Anschluss in August 1938 he left Vienna and travelled to Switzerland were he was later joined by his wife Slawa Horowitz Duldig and his daughter Eva Duldig. In 1939 they travelled to Singapore – from where they were later deported, and were sent to Australia – where for two years he and his family were interned as enemy aliens. As a sculptor, he often used a minimalist style, won the 1956 Victorian Sculptor of the Year Award, and had an annual lecture established in his name by the National Gallery of Victoria.

Biography

Early years

 
Duldig was born in Przemyśl, Galicia, Poland. His parents were Marcus Duldig and Eidla (Eydl) nee Nebenzahl Duldig. In 1914 his family moved to Vienna. He studied sculpture under Anton Hanak at the Kunstgewerbeschule from 1921–25. He then studied sculpture at the Akademie der Bildenden Künste in Vienna from 1925–29. From 1930-1933 he undertook Masters studies with  Professor Josef Müller at the Akademie der Bildenden Künste. 

In 1923 he was Austrian national champion in table tennis. He also played football as a goalkeeper for Hakoah Wien, and was one of Austria's top tennis players.

In 1931 he married artist and inventor Slawa Horowitz Duldig, who had patented the first folding umbrella in 1929. Their only child, Eva Duldig, was born in 1938. Eva became a champion Australian tennis player who played in Wimbledon, the French Championships, the Australian Open, and at the Maccabiah Games in Israel where she won two gold medals, and is founder of the present-day Duldig Studio, an artists' house museum in Melbourne, Australia.

Switzerland and Singapore; Fleeing Nazi Europe

As the Nazis entered Austria, the family left first for Switzerland. He first travelled to Switzerland without his wife and child, on a temporary visa to play in a tennis tournament, and later that year convinced an official to allow his family to “visit” him there in Zurich, thereby staying a step ahead of the Holocaust. The family was only allowed to stay in Switzerland for a short time.

The family then left for Singapore by boat in April 1939, where initially he and Slawa ran an art school and he restored paintings, and completed commissions for the Sultan of Johor and Aw Boon Haw. In Singapore, however, six months after their arrival the British arrested them, because they had German identity papers. Austria had been annexed by Germany in March 1938 in the Anschluss, and therefore the family and all other Austrians by law had become citizens of the German Reich. The British colonial government classified them as "citizens of an enemy country," and they were deported by boat from Singapore to Australia in September 1940.

Australia; enemy alien, sculptor
They were deported by boat from Singapore to Australia in September 1940.> In Australia, in the wake of the outbreak of World War II, he, Slawa, and two-year-old Eva were classified as enemy aliens upon their arrival due to their having arrived with German identity papers. The Australian government therefore interned the three of them for two years, from 1940 to 1942, in isolated Tatura Internment Camp 3 D with 295 other internees, mostly families. The internment camp was located near Shepparton, in the northern part of the state of Victoria. There, armed soldiers manned watchtowers and scanned the camp that was bordered by a barbed wire fence with searchlights, and other armed soldiers patrolled the camp. Petitions to Australian politicians, stressing that they were Jewish refugees and therefore being unjustly imprisoned, had no effect. The family later lived in St Kilda and East Malvern, and became Australian citizens.

From 1945 to 1967 Duldig was art master at Mentone Grammar School. As a sculptor, he exhibited at Victorian Sculptors' Society, and was featured in the 1956 Olympic Games art festival, the Mildura Sculpture Triennials, and the Adelaide Festival of Arts. Works of his are displayed in the City of Caulfield, Melbourne General Cemetery War Memorial, Council House, the Australian National Gallery, and the Australian War Memorial. His works are also shown at the National Gallery of Victoria, the McClelland Gallery and Sculpture Park, and the Newcastle Region Art Gallery.

He often used a minimalist style.  In 1956 Duldig won the Victorian Sculptor of the Year Award. In 1968, his bronze statue in memory of fallen sportspeople who were killed in the Holocaust was unveiled in Tel Aviv, Israel.

After his wife died in 1975, in 1983 he married Rosia Ida Dorin.

In 1986 an annual lecture was established in his name by the National Gallery of Victoria.

In 2002 his daughter Eva founded the Duldig Studio in East Malvern, a not-for-profit public museum and art gallery, in her former family home. It displays the works of her parents.

Family

 

Karl and Slawa's daughter Eva became a tennis player, and competed at the Wimbledon Championships in 1961 for Australia. She also played at Wimbledon in 1962 and 1963 for the Netherlands, and competed in the Australian Open, French Championships, Fed Cup, and in the Maccabiah Games in Israel where she won two gold medals. Eva later wrote a memoir, Driftwood: Escape and Survival through Art (Melbourne: Australian Scholarly Publishing and Arcadia, 2017) about her family's experiences. In 2017, it received a Victorian Community History Award and in 2018, it was longlisted for the Dobbie Award. Her memoir was made into a musical in 2022, entitled Driftwood – The Musical, directed by Wesley Enoch. Her daughter Tania wrote some of the lyrics. Australian Broadcasting Corporation wrote that the musical "is a remarkable story".  The Australian Jewish News wrote: "there's no shortage of drama, heartache and lucky escape." Limelight wrote that the musical was "sincere to a fault." The Age wrote: "Director Gary Abrahams keeps the story's emotional core vivid and convincing and Anthony Barnhill's score suits the material well. The singing is excellent....  this show has heart."

Karl's granddaughter, Tania de Jong, born in 1964, is an Australian soprano, social entrepreneur, and businesswoman. In 1965, after Tania's birth, the family returned to Melbourne, and after she gave birth to two more children Duldig found it challenging to maintain her tennis. After her tennis career, she worked as a recreation consultant, a writer, and a designer of children's play spaces.

In 2022, Karl's great-granddaughters Andrea and Emma de Jong ran in the 2022 Maccabiah Games, and Emma won the 800 metres and 1,500-metre run as a junior.

See also
List of honours dedicated to Raoul Wallenberg

References 

1902 births
1986 deaths
20th-century Australian male artists
20th-century Polish male artists
Academy of Fine Arts Vienna alumni
Artists from Melbourne
Artists from Victoria (Australia)
Artists from Vienna
Australian art teachers
Australian Jews
Austrian Jews
Austrian male sculptors
Australian sculptors
Australian schoolteachers
Jewish emigrants from Austria to Australia after the Anschluss
Jewish sculptors
Jewish table tennis players
Austrian male table tennis players
Modern sculptors
People from Przemyśl
People from Shepparton